The WhatsOnStage Award for Best Performer in a Male Identifying Role in a Play is an annual award presented by WhatsOnStage.com as part of the annual WhatsOnStage Awards. Founded in 2001 as the Theatregoers' Choice Awards, the WhatsOnStage Awards are based on a popular vote recognising performers and productions in London's West End theatre.

This award is given to a person who has performed a leading male identifying role in a play during the eligibility year. Introduced in 2001 as the award for Best Actor in a Play, the category was renamed in 2022 in an effort to be more inclusive. The category was discontinued following the 2022 ceremony and was replaced with the gender-neutral WhatsOnstage Award for Best Performer in a Play.

First presented to Conleth Hill at the inaugural ceremony, Kenneth Branagh, Kevin Spacey and David Tennant are the only actors to have won the award twice.

Winners and nominees

2000s

2010s

2020s

Multiple wins and nominations

Wins
2 wins
 Kenneth Branagh
 Kevin Spacey
 David Tennant

Nominations
4 nominations
 Simon Russell Beale
 Mark Rylance
 Kevin Spacey

3 nominations
 Kenneth Branagh
 Benedict Cumberbatch
 James McAvoy
 David Tennant

2 nominations

References

External links
 Official website

British theatre awards